Kaisareia is a village and a community of the Kozani municipality. Before the 2011 local government reform it was part of the municipality of Elimeia, of which it was a municipal district. The 2011 census recorded 615 inhabitants in the village and 744 inhabitants in the community of Kaisareia. The community of Kaisareia covers an area of 16.328 km2.

Administrative division
The community of Kaisareia consists of two separate settlements: 
Kaisareia (population 615)
Kipos (population 129)
The aforementioned populations figures are as of 2011.

See also
List of settlements in the Kozani regional unit

References

Populated places in Kozani (regional unit)